Fent may refer to:

Fentanyl, an opioid drug also used recreationally
FENT, a probe developed by the Laboratory for Energy Conversion
Lance Baker Fent, guitarist for The Peanut Butter Conspiracy
Kathleen Fent, wife of internet personality Rob Malda